Jang Tae-yoo (born 1972) is a South Korean television director. He directed the Korean dramas War of Money (2007), Painter of the Wind (2008), Deep Rooted Tree (2011), My Love from the Star (2013-2014), Hyena (2020), and Lovers of the Red Sky (2021).

Career
Jang Tae-yoo entered Seoul National University in 1998 majoring in Industrial Design, but eventually dropped out. He originally wanted to direct commercials, but during the IMF crisis, there were no new hires at advertising agencies. So his older brother Jang Hyuk-jae, then a television director at SBS, encouraged him to join the network.

Jang began working as an assistant director on the television drama Tomato in 1999, which he later described as more difficult than mandatory military service. This was followed by Woman on Top (also in 1999; though he was replaced after three months), Ladies in the Palace (2001-2002), Sunrise House (2002), and Punch (2003). He was also the second unit director on Choice (2004-2005) and Bad Housewife (2005).

Jang's first drama as the lead director was The 101st Proposal (2006) starring Lee Moon-sik and Park Sun-young, a remake of the same-titled 1991 Japanese drama about an unattractive but kind-hearted aging bachelor who meets the girl of his dreams, a TV announcer still mourning her dead boyfriend. Then in 2007, Jang directed War of Money, which explored loan shark culture and drew high ratings as well as praise for its cast led by Park Shin-yang (Park later won the highest honor, called the "Daesang" or Grand Prize, at the 2007 SBS Drama Awards). Jang reunited with Park in the period drama Painter of the Wind (2008), adapted from Lee Jung-myung's historical fiction novel that depicted the relationship between two Joseon era artists, Kim Hong-do and Shin Yun-bok (the latter is a woman disguised as a man, portrayed by Moon Geun-young). Though Jang said he found it "challenging to make art interesting," the drama drew critical acclaim, particularly for Moon, who became the youngest ever Daesang winner at the 2008 SBS Drama Awards. War of Money and Painter of the Wind established Jang as one of the top production-directors (or "PD") in Korean television.

For his next drama, Jang chose another Lee Jung-myung adaptation Deep Rooted Tree (2011), about a murder mystery surrounding King Sejong's invention of the Hangul system. It starred Han Suk-kyu and Jang Hyuk, and was notable for Han's return to television after appearing mostly in films (Han won the Daesang at the 2011 SBS Drama Awards). Jang's track record continued to attract movie stars to the small screen, followed by Jun Ji-hyun in My Love from the Star (2013-2014). Written by Park Ji-eun (herself a hitmaker), the romantic-sci-fi dramedy about an alien who falls for a famous actress (played by Kim Soo-hyun and Jun) was popular domestically and overseas. The drama's massive success in the Chinese market led to more opportunities for Jang, so he took a leave of absence from SBS, and signed an exclusive five-year contract with Yuehua Entertainment. His next project will be a Chinese 3D romantic comedy film.

Jang is also an adjunct professor of Performing Arts at the Seoul Arts College since the first semester of 2012.

Filmography

As assistant director
Tomato (SBS, 1999)
Woman on Top (SBS, 1999)
Ladies in the Palace (SBS, 2001-2002)
Sunrise House (SBS, 2002)
Punch (SBS, 2003)

As second unit director
Choice (SBS, 2004-2005)
Bad Housewife (SBS, 2005)

As director

Drama
The 101st Proposal (SBS, 2006)
War of Money (SBS, 2007)
Painter of the Wind (SBS, 2008)
Deep Rooted Tree (SBS, 2011)
My Love from the Star (SBS, 2013-2014)
Hyena (SBS, 2020)
Lovers of the Red Sky (SBS, 2021)

Film
MBA Partners (2016)

Awards and nominations

References

External links
 
 
 
 

1972 births
Living people
South Korean television directors
People from Seoul